Ryan McGinley (born October 17, 1977) is an American photographer living in New York City. McGinley began making photographs in 1998. In 2003, at the age of 25, he was one of the youngest artists to have a solo show at the Whitney Museum of American Art. He was named Photographer of the Year in 2003 by American Photo Magazine. In 2007, McGinley was awarded the Young Photographer Infinity Award by the International Center of Photography. In 2009, he was honored at The Young Collectors Council's Artists Ball at the Guggenheim Museum. A 2014 GQ article declared McGinley, "the most important photographer in America."

Early life and education
McGinley was born in Ramsey, New Jersey, and is the youngest of eight children. From an early age his peers and mentors were skateboarders, graffiti artists, musicians, and artists that were considered to be on the fringes of society. As a teenager, McGinley was a snowboard instructor at Campgaw Mountain, NJ, and competed in the east coast amateur circuits from 1992 to 1995. He enrolled as a graphic design student at Parsons School of Design in New York in 1997. In 1998, he moved to the East Village, and covered the walls of his apartment with Polaroid pictures of everyone who visited him there.

Work
As a student at Parsons, McGinley began experimenting with photography. In 1999, he put these early images together in a handmade, self-published book called The Kids Are Alright, titled after a film about The Who. McGinley had his first public exhibition in 2000 at 420 West Broadway in Manhattan in a DIY opening. One copy of The Kids Are Alright was given to scholar and curator Sylvia Wolf, who later organized McGinley's solo exhibition at the Whitney. In an essay about McGinley, Wolf wrote, "The skateboarders, musicians, graffiti artists and gay people in Mr. McGinley's early work 'know what it means to be photographed. [...] His subjects are performing for the camera and exploring themselves with an acute self-awareness that is decidedly contemporary. They are savvy about visual culture, acutely aware of how identity can be not only communicated but created. They are willing collaborators." While he was a student at Parsons, McGinley was also the acting photo editor at Vice magazine from 2000 to 2002.

McGinley has been long time friends with fellow Lower Manhattan artists Dan Colen and the late Dash Snow. McGinley said of Snow, "I guess I get obsessed with people, and I really became fascinated by Dash."

Ariel Levy, writing in New York magazine about McGinley's friend and collaborator, Snow, said, "People fall in love with McGinleyʼs work because it tells a story about liberation and hedonism: Where Goldin and Larry Clark were saying something painful and anxiety producing about Kids and what happens when they take drugs and have sex in an ungoverned urban underworld, McGinley started out announcing that 'The Kids Are Alright,' fantastic, really, and suggested that a gleeful, unfettered subculture was just around the corner—'still'—if only you knew where to look."

McGinley's early work was primarily shot on 35mm film and using Yashica T4s and Leica R8s. Since 2004, McGinley's style has evolved from documenting his friends in real-life situations towards creating envisioned situations that can be photographed. He casts his subjects at rock ‘n’ roll festivals, art schools, and street castings in cities. In describing the essence of youth and adventure central to McGinley's work, Jeffrey Kluger wrote in TIME, "Photography is about freezing a moment in time; McGinley's is about freezing a stage in a lifetime. Young and beautiful is as fleeting as a camera snap— and thus all the more worth preserving." In 2007, critic Philip Gefter wrote, "He was a fly on the wall. But then he began to direct the activities, photographing his subjects in a cinema-verite mode. 'I got to the point where I couldn't wait for the pictures to happen anymore,' he said. 'I was wasting time, and so I started making pictures happen. It borders between being set up or really happening. There's that fine line.'" This transition to creating work with an emphasis on heavy pre-production is embodied in McGinley's famous summer cross-country road trip series. In a 2014 feature, GQ wrote, "His road trips, legendary among city-dwelling creatives under 30 (they all know someone who knows someone who went on one), have been annual summer occasions for almost a decade. McGinley and his assistants start planning the journey in January. They consult maps, newspapers, travel books. It usually starts with a specific desire—wanting to shoot kids in a cypress tree with Spanish moss, say—and the trip itself is plotted according to where such a setting can be found." As McGinley continued this series, he began incorporating different elements into his photos, such as shooting with fireworks, animals, and in extreme locations like caves.

In conversation with filmmaker Gus Van Sant, McGinley described his practice of making photographs on the road and outside of his New York City based studio, "Such a big part of what I do is removing myself and other people from the city. Taking people to these beautiful and remote locations, being together for long periods of time, getting that intimacy, and doing all these intense activities together every day. In a way, it's like a bizarre summer camp or like touring in a rock band or traveling circus. It's all those things combined. Just taking everyone out of their element so you have their full attention."

In 2009, McGinley returned to the studio as he began experimenting within the confines of traditional studio portraiture. This was also the beginning of what would by 2010 become an all entirely digital photography practice. The result was his 2010 exhibition, Everybody Knows This Is Nowhere, at Team Gallery in NYC, where he displayed his first collection of black and white nudes. This series marked a significant shift in the style and production of McGinley's photographs. His continued work within the realm of digital studio portraiture eventually evolved into his Yearbook series. Team Gallery describes the 2014 installation as, "(...) a single artwork that consists of over five hundred studio portraits of some two hundred models, always in the nude, printed on vinyl and adhered to every available inch of the gallery's walls and ceilings. The installation's effect is hugely impressive in its standalone visual power, an enveloping entity flooding the entire space with bold color and form. Although the sheer abundance of available images renders a total "reading" impossible, there is never any sense of incompleteness, as each individual image functions autonomously, granting the viewer access to a delicate, once-private moment." Yearbook is a traveling exhibition, and while it has evolved in size and application process, it has been exhibited internationally in various forms in San Francisco, Amersfoort, Basel, and Tokyo.

Throughout his career, McGinley has worked with various high-profile charities. Influenced by the death of his brother in 1995 due to HIV/AIDS-related complications, McGinley is vocally passionate about raising funds for HIV/AIDS awareness and treatment research. At the 2014 amfAR Gala, a photograph donated by McGinley was purchased by Miley Cyrus, who narrowly outbid Tom Ford, for a record breaking price. Also in 2014 McGinley photographed Ines Rau, a transgender person, fully nude for a spread in Playboy magazine called "Evolution."

In recent years, McGinley has become well known for the circle of successful younger artists surrounding him and his studio, prompting the New York Times to refer to him as, "The Pied Piper of the Downtown Art World". McGinley describes his mentorship practices as, "In a way, it's a curriculum, as I can give people advice because I’ve been through it."

In 2014, McGinley delivered the commencement address at Parsons School of Design. To graduating students he offered the advice, "Say yes to almost everything and try new things. Don't be afraid to fail, and don't be afraid to work hard. Do your pictures—don't try and do somebody else's pictures. Don't get lost inside your head, and don't worry what camera you’re using." He continued, "I once heard the legendary indie director Derek Jarman had three rules for making his art films: 'Show up early, hold your own light, and don’t expect to get paid.' That always stuck with me. Approach art like it's your job. Show up for photography every day for eight hours. Take it as seriously as a doctor would medicine." Since 2005, McGinley has periodically lectured and done critiques with MFA photography students at Yale University. He has also been a member of the School of Visual Arts Mentors program.

Music
McGinley is credited for the formation of the New York City based band The Virgins after introducing and photographing two of its members in Tulum in 2004. McGinley said of the band, "Their lyrics are really poetic and very much about New York and the life that we live."

In 2008, the Icelandic post-rock band Sigur Rós used one of McGinley's images for their fifth album Með suð í eyrum við spilum endalaust. The video for the first track from the album, "Gobbledigook", was inspired by his work. In 2012, McGinley reunited with the band to direct the video for "Varúð". The non-profit Art Production Fund partnered with the NYC Taxi Commission to show the film in 3,000 cabs. The following year, it was screened in Times Square as part of Art Production Fund's Midnight Moment series, in which every night at midnight for one month the video played simultaneously on electronic billboards and newspaper kiosks throughout Times Square.

McGinley has photographed musicians for both album artwork and editorial projects. In 2012, he provided the artwork for Bat for Lashes's album The Haunted Man. In 2013, he created images for Katy Perry's fourth studio album, Prism. He had also photographed musicians Beyonce for BEAT Magazine, Lady Gaga for Rolling Stone, and Lorde for Dazed and Confused.

Commercial and Editorial work
McGinley has contributed editorial assignments to The New York Times Magazine, including his 2004 Olympic Swimmers, 2008 Oscars Portfolio, and 2010 Winter Olympics.

He has worked in fashion editorial and advertising. In 2009, McGinley helped launch Levi's "Go Forth" campaign. In 2012 and 2013, he worked with U2 singer Bono on producing a short film and photographs for fashion brand EDUN. Additionally, he has made photographs for beauty and fragrance campaigns by Calvin Klein, Dior, Hermès, and Stella McCartney.

McGinley has also been featured as a model in campaigns by The Gap, Marc Jacobs, Salvatore Ferragamo, and Uniqlo.

Short films
 2010: Friends Forever
 2010: Entrance Romance
 2010: Pringle of Scotland – Spring Summer 2010, with Tilda Swinton (7:59 min.)
 2012: Beautiful Rebels
 2012: Varúð, for Sigur Rós
 2012: The Virgins: Prima Materia
 2013: Mind of its own, for Mercedes-Benz
 2015: We Three, with David Armstrong and Jack Pierson

Exhibitions
In 2003, the Whitney Museum gave McGinley a solo show as part of their First Exposure series. He has also had solo shows at MoMA P.S.1 in New York (2004), and at the MUSAC in Leon, Spain (2005). In 2005, he was the laureate of the Rencontres d'Arles Discovery Award.

In 2007 McGinley exhibited Irregular Regulars at Team Gallery in SoHo. Art critic David Velasco, in his review of the show, wrote, "McGinley went on a two-year road trip, traveling to dozens of Morrissey concerts in the US, the UK, and Mexico. The resultant photos, many of which are densely saturated in the concerts’ colored lights, feature candid shots of fans, regularly zooming in for seductive close-ups of enamored youngsters—a celebration of the ecstatic cult of fame and its ardent enablers."

In 2008 he exhibited I Know Where the Summer Goes, also at Team Gallery. Kluger, writing in Time magazine, said, "But his favorite subject remains youth, as his 2008 exhibit, 'I Know Where the Summer Goes,' proves. In that collection, McGinley's troupe travels the country as he photographs them, sometimes clothed and often not, while they leap fences, lounge in a desert, play together in a tree."

In 2010, McGinley debuted his first collection of black and white studio nudes, Everybody Knows This Is Nowhere, at Team Gallery in New York. Later in 2010, McGinley's exhibition Life Adjustment Center was held at Ratio 3 in San Francisco. There he debuted two new portfolios of black and white portraits and color photographs.

In 2012, McGinley had simultaneous shows at Team Gallery's two SoHo locations. Animals and Grids juxtaposed two new series of photographs: nudes with animals and large grids of intimate portraits of young concert-goers.

In 2013, McGinley exhibited his largest project to date,Yearbook. A collection of hundreds of colorful studio portraits but conceived as a single artwork, the installation covered every available inch of the walls of San Francisco's Ratio 3. In 2014, the exhibition grew larger, this time staged at Team Gallery. Yearbook continued to travel in 2015, showing at Kunsthal kAdE in Amersfoort and Art Unlimited at Art Basel.

In 2015, McGinley's work further departed from his summer road trip series with bicoastal exhibitions Fall and Winter, at Team Gallery's SoHo and Venice Beach locations.

McGinley's work was also featured in the Guggenheim Museum's 2015 exhibition, Storylines. The show was described as "an expansive view of the new paradigms for storytelling forged during the past ten years to communicate ideas about race, gender, sexuality, history, and politics, among other trenchant themes."

Collections
McGinley's work is held in the following public collections:
Solomon R. Guggenheim Museum, New York
Institute of Contemporary Art, Miami
National Portrait Gallery, Washington, D.C.
San Francisco Museum of Modern Art
Whitney Museum of American Art, New York

Publications
 The Kids Are Alright. New York: Handmade, 2002.
 Ryan McGinley (PS1 exhibition catalogue). New York: Flasher Factory, 2004. .
 Sun and Health. Paris: agnès b. Galerie du Jour, 2006. .
 Moonmilk. London: Mörel, 2009. .
 Life Adjustment Center. New York: Dashwood, 2010. .
 You and I. Santa Fe: Twin Palms, 2011. .
 Whistle for the Wind. Milan: Rizzoli International, 2012. .
 Way Far. Milan: Rizzoli International, 2015. .
The Journey is the Destination: the Ryan McGinley Purple Book. Paris: Purple Institute, 2013. Originally distributed with Purple Fashion issue 19.

References

External links
 
Team Gallery
Ratio 3
Ryan McGinley at Bischoff Projects, Frankfurt am Main
Artforum
TIME
A Young Man With an Eye, and Friends Up a Tree by Philip Gefter, New York Times, May 6, 2007
Body Loud in Art Days

1977 births
Living people
American gay artists
American LGBT photographers
Parsons School of Design alumni
People from Ramsey, New Jersey
Photographers from New York (state)
People from the East Village, Manhattan